Apotominae is a subfamily of beetles in the family Carabidae. It contains the single genus Apotomus with the following species:

 Apotomus alluaudi Jeannel, 1946
 Apotomus angusticollis J. Muller, 1943
 Apotomus annulaticornis Peringuey, 1896
 Apotomus atripennis Motschulsky, 1858
 Apotomus australis Castelnau, 1867
 Apotomus chaudoirii Wollaston, 1860
 Apotomus clypeonitens J. Muller, 1943
 Apotomus fairmairei Jeannel, 1946
 Apotomus flavescens Apetz, 1854
 Apotomus hirsutulus Bates, 1892
 Apotomus latigena Reitter, 1892
 Apotomus minor Baehr, 1990
 Apotomus neghellianus G. Muller, 1942
 Apotomus qiongshanensis Tian, 2000
 Apotomus reichardti Erwin, 1980
 Apotomus rufithorax Pecchioli, 1837
 Apotomus rufus P. Rossi, 1790
 Apotomus sahelianus Mateu, 1966
 Apotomus sumbawanus Dupius, 1911
 Apotomus syriacus Jedlicka, 1961
 Apotomus testaceus Dejean, 1825
 Apotomus velox Motschulsky, 1858

References

Carabidae genera
Beetles described in 1807